is a railway station in Amorebieta-Etxano, Basque Country, Spain. It is owned by Euskal Trenbide Sarea and operated by Euskotren. It lies on the Urdaibai line.

History 
A halt had existed in the location of the current station at least before the civil war, but it was closed on an unknown date. The current station opened in 1973, together with the chord that allowed trains from Bilbao to enter the Urdaibai line directly from the Bilbao-San Sebastián line without the need to reverse at Amorebieta station. The station has a single track with side platforms on both sides, but normally only one of them is in use.

Services 
The station is served by Euskotren Trena line E4. It runs every 30 minutes (in each direction) during weekdays, and every hour during weekends.

References 

Railway stations in Spain opened in 1973
Euskotren Trena stations
Railway stations in Biscay